Wallace Cosgrow is a Seychellois politician who served as the Minister for Environment, Energy and Climate Change. He was appointed by President Danny Faure on 26 April 2018 after a cabinet reshuffle. He served until 3 November 2020. He was formerly Minister for Industry, Entrepreneurship Development and Business Innovation in 2017.

References

External links
Wallace Cosgrow at Huffington Post

Living people
Seychellois politicians
Energy ministers of Seychelles
Environment ministers of Seychelles
Industry ministers of Seychelles
Year of birth missing (living people)